Clayton is a town in Johnston County, North Carolina, United States, and is considered a satellite town of Raleigh. As of 2010, Clayton's population was 16,116, up from 6,973 at the 2000 census. By 2019 the town's estimated population was 24,887. Much of that growth can be attributed to the town's proximity to the Research Triangle area and access to major highways such as I-40 and US 70.

History

The Clayton Banking Company Building, Clayton Graded School and Clayton Grammar School-Municipal Auditorium, Clayton Historic District, Cleveland School, Ellington-Ellis Farm, Walter R. and Eliza Smith Moore House, Sanders-Hairr House, and Stallings-Carpenter House are listed on the National Register of Historic Places.

Geography
Clayton is in northern Johnston County, with a small portion extending northwest along US 70 Business into Wake County. In 2006, construction began on the Highway 70 Clayton Bypass, a  stretch from Interstate 40 along the southern portion of Clayton to Highway 70 business southeast of town. It was completed in June 2008. US 70 leads southeast  to Interstate 95 at Smithfield. Many local  unincorporated communities outside of the town limits use Clayton mailing addresses, including Cleveland, Powhatan, and Flowers.

The town is part of the Neuse River watershed. The town limits now extend northeast to the Neuse River and beyond.

Town Hall is located at 111 East Second Street and is shared with The Clayton Center, a performing arts and conference center.

Climate

According to the Köppen Climate Classification system, Clayton has a humid subtropical climate, abbreviated "Cfa" on climate maps.

Demographics

2020 census

As of the 2020 United States census, there were 26,307 people, 7,488 households, and 5,294 families residing in the town.

2010 census
As of the 2010 census, there were 16,116 residents living within the Town of Clayton. There were 5,944 households, with an average of 2.57 persons per household. The racial makeup of the town was 69.5% White, 21.8% African American, 10.7% Hispanic or Latino 0.4% American Indian, 1.4% Asian, 0% Pacific Islander.

Of the 5,944 households in the 2010 census, 44% had children under the age of 18 living with them, 50.6% were married couples living together, 15.2% had a female householder with no husband present, and 30% were non-families. 25.4% of non-family households were made up of householders living alone. 16.3% of households had individuals 65 years of age or older.

The age demographics of the 2010 census determined that 32.9% were under the age of 19, 4.9% were aged 20 to 24, 32.8% aged 25 to 44, 20.8% aged 45 to 64, and 8.5% were 65 years of age or older. The median age was 34.9 years. Females made up 52.5% of the population while males made up 47.5% of the population.

The median income for a household in the town was $53,101, and the median income for a family was $64,856.  Males had a median income of $46,108 versus $40,839 for females. The per capita income for the town was $26,234.  These figures put Town of Clayton well ahead of the North Carolina averages for the same categories.

Government

Town Council

Education
 Clayton High School (Home of the Comets)
 Cleveland High School (Home of the Rams) 
 Clayton Middle School (Home of the Eagles)
 Cooper Academy (Home of the Rockets)
 Cleveland Elementary School (Home of the Rams)
 East Clayton Elementary School (Home of the Explorers)
 Powhatan Elementary School (Home of the Pride)
 River Dell Elementary School (Home of the Racers)
 Riverwood Elementary School (Home of the Rams)
 Riverwood Middle School (Home of the Ravens)
 West Clayton Elementary School (Home of the Bulldogs)

Notable people
 Chris Archer, Major League Baseball player 
 Valerie Ashby, chemist and university professor
 Sam Beddingfield, test pilot and a pioneering aerospace engineer
 Gary Clark, NBA player
 William Dodd (1869–1940), historian who served as the United States Ambassador to Germany from 1933 to 1937 during the Nazi era
 Vern Duncan, former Major League Baseball player
 Douglas Ellington, architect noted for his work in the Art Deco style
 Eric Ellington, pioneer of military aviation and namesake of Ellington Field in Houston, Texas
 Kendra "Keni" Harrison, set the world record in the women's 100 metres hurdles with a time of 12.20 seconds on July 22, 2016, at the London Grand Prix
 Jaylee Burley Mead (1929–2012), astronomer who spent career at NASA's Goddard Space Flight Center
 Rodney Rowe, track and field sprinter
 James Talacek, professional aquanaut
 Kodi Whitley, Major League Baseball pitcher

References

External links
 
 Clayton Chamber of Commerce

1869 establishments in North Carolina
Populated places established in 1869
Populated places on the Neuse River
Towns in Johnston County, North Carolina
Towns in Wake County, North Carolina
Towns in North Carolina